New Unionville is an unincorporated community in Benton Township, Monroe County, in the U.S. state of Indiana.

History
New Unionville was founded in 1906.

Geography
New Unionville is located at  near the city of Bloomington.  Indiana State Road 45 and the Indiana Rail Road pass through the community.  There is a Baptist church and a recycling center in the area.

References

External links

Officialcitysites.org: New Unionville

Bloomington metropolitan area, Indiana
Unincorporated communities in Monroe County, Indiana
Unincorporated communities in Indiana